Warnachar (sometimes numbered Warnachar II; in modern French, Warnachaire or Garnier) was the mayor of the palace of Burgundy (617-626) and briefly Austrasia (612-617).  He began his career as the regent during Theuderic II's minority (596-c.604). In 612, when Theuderic became king of Austrasia, he became mayor of the palace. In 613, he allied with King Clotaire II of Neustria, feeling that the young Sigebert II should not be under the hated Brunhilda's influence.  He betrayed Brunhilda into Clotaire's hands by instructing the army not to oppose the invading Neustrian. When Clotaire then became sole king of the Franks, he left Warnachar in power in Austrasia briefly, but confirmed at Bonneuil-sur-Marne, in 617, Warnachar's function in Burgundy until his death in 626 (or 627 or 628, when he is said to have called a synod of Burgundian bishops). His son, Godinus, succeeded him.

620s deaths
Mayors of the Palace
Year of birth unknown